Thomas Cutler may refer to:

Thomas Cutler (Canadian politician) (1752–1837), judge and politician from Nova Scotia
Thomas J. Cutler (born 1947), American Naval officer, historian, and author
Thomas Cutler (MP), Member of Parliament for Winchester, c. 1421